Karen Spärck Jones  (26 August 1935 – 4 April 2007) was a self-taught programmer and a pioneering British computer scientist responsible for the concept of inverse document frequency (IDF), a technology that underlies most modern search engines. She was an advocate for women in the field of computer science. She even came up with a slogan: “Computing is too important to be left to men.” In 2019, The New York Times published her belated obituary in its series Overlooked, calling her "a pioneer of computer science for work combining statistics and linguistics, and an advocate for women in the field." From 2008, to recognize her achievements in the fields of information retrieval (IR) and natural language processing (NLP), the Karen Spärck Jones Award is awarded to a new recipient with outstanding research in one or both of her fields.

Early life and education
Karen Ida Boalth Spärck Jones was born in Huddersfield, Yorkshire, England. Her parents were Alfred Owen Jones, a chemistry lecturer, and Ida Sparck, who worked for the Norwegian government while in exile in London during World War II.

Spärck Jones was educated at a grammar school in Huddersfield and then from 1953 to 1956 at Girton College, Cambridge, studying history, with an additional final year in Moral Sciences (philosophy). While at Cambridge,  Spärck Jones joined the organization known as the Cambridge Language Research Unit (CLRU) and met the head of CLRU Margaret Masterman, who would inspire her to go into computer science. Through her work at the CLRU, Sparck-Jones began pursuing her Ph.D. At the time of submission, her Ph.D thesis was cast aside as uninspired and lacking original thought but was later published in its entirety as a book. She briefly became a school teacher, before moving into computer science. Spärck Jones married fellow Cambridge computer scientist Roger Needham in 1958.

Career
Spärck Jones worked at the Cambridge Language Research Unit from the late 1950s, then at Cambridge University Computer Laboratory from 1974 until her retirement in 2002. 

From 1999, she held the post of Professor of Computers and Information. Prior to 1999, she was employed on a series of short-term contracts. She continued to work in the Computer Laboratory until shortly before her death. Her publications include nine books and numerous papers. A full list of her publications is available from the Cambridge Computer Laboratory.

Spärck Jones' main research interests, since the late 1950s, were natural language processing and information retrieval.  In 1964, Spärck Jones published “Synonymy and Semantic Classification,” which is now seen as a foundational paper in the field of natural language processing. But, one of her most important contributions was the concept of inverse document frequency (IDF) weighting in information retrieval, which she introduced in a 1972 paper. IDF is used in most search engines today, usually as part of the term frequency–inverse document frequency (TF–IDF) weighting scheme.  In the 1980s, Spärck Jones began her work on early speech recognition systems. In 1982 she became involved in the Alvey Programme which was an initiative to motivate more computer science research across the country. In 1997, she was honored by City University at their graduation ceremony where she was awarded the honorary degree of Doctor of Science by the Vice Chancellor, Raoul Franklin.

Honours and awards
An annual Karen Spärck Jones Award and lecture is named in her honour. In August 2017, the University of Huddersfield renamed one of its campus buildings in her honour. Formerly known as Canalside West, the Spärck Jones building houses the University's School of Computing and Engineering. Other honours and awards include
 Elected a Fellow of the British Academy (FBA), where she also served as Vice-President in 2000–2002
 Elected a Fellow of Association for the Advancement of Artificial Intelligence (AAAI) in 1993
 Fellow of European Association for Artificial Intelligence (ECCAI)
 President of the Association for Computational Linguistics (ACL) in 1994
 Gerard Salton Award (1988)
 Association for Information Science and Technology (ASIS&T) Award of Merit (2002)
 Association for Computational Linguistics (ACL) Lifetime Achievement Award (2004)
 BCS Lovelace Medal (2007)
 ACM - AAAI Allen Newell Award (2006)
 Association for Computing Machinery (ACM) Women's Group Athena Award (2007)

Death and Legacy

Spärck Jones died on April 4, 2007 due to cancer at the age of 71. 

In 2008, the BCS Information Retrieval Specialist Group (BCS IRSG) in conjunction with the British Computer Society established an annual award in Spärck Jones' honour, to encourage and promote talented researchers' significant contributions in advancing our understanding of Natural Language Processing or Information Retrieval.

References

1935 births
2007 deaths
Alumni of Girton College, Cambridge
British computer scientists
British women computer scientists
Fellows of the British Academy
Fellows of the Association for the Advancement of Artificial Intelligence
Fellows of Newnham College, Cambridge
Fellows of Wolfson College, Cambridge
Members of the University of Cambridge Computer Laboratory
People from Huddersfield
Deaths from cancer in England
Information retrieval researchers
Artificial intelligence researchers
20th-century British women scientists
People from South Cambridgeshire District
Natural language processing researchers